Sainte-Croix-sur-Aizier (literally Sainte-Croix on Aizier) is a former commune in the Eure department in Normandy in northern France. On 1 January 2016, it was merged into the new commune of Bourneville-Sainte-Croix.

Population

See also
Communes of the Eure department

References

Former communes of Eure